KFSO-FM (92.9 FM) is a radio station broadcasting a Spanish adult hits format. Licensed to Visalia, California, United States, it serves the Fresno/Visalia/Tulare area.  The station is currently owned by iHeartMedia, Inc.  Its studios are located on Shaw Avenue in North Fresno, and the transmitter tower is in Visalia.

KFSO-FM broadcasts two channels in HD.

Prior to Spanish, the station played Oldies calling itself "92.9 K-FRESNO" and later "KOOL 92.9."

Previous logo

92.9 K-Fresno
Kool 92.9

References

External links
La Preciosa 92.9 website

FSO-FM
Mass media in Fresno County, California
Mass media in Tulare County, California
Radio stations established in 1961
1951 establishments in California
FSO-FM
IHeartMedia radio stations